James Earl Johnson (born March 31, 1938) is an American former professional football player and Olympic track athlete.

Johnson was born in Dallas and raised in Kingsburg, California. He is the younger brother of Rafer Johnson, winner of the decathlon gold medal at the 1960 Summer Olympics. Johnson played college football and ran track at UCLA. He won the NCAA 110-meter hurdles championship and was named an All-American in track and field.

Johnson was the sixth player selected in the 1961 NFL Draft and played for the San Francisco 49ers in the National Football League (NFL) from 1961 to 1976. He was selected four times as a first-team All-Pro and played in five Pro Bowls. His jersey (No. 37) was permanently retired by the 49ers in 1977. In 1980, he was named as a first-string cornerback on the NFL 1970s All-Decade Team, and in 1994 he was inducted into the Pro Football Hall of Fame.

Early years
Johnson was born in 1938 in Dallas. His family moved to central California when Johnson was a boy. He attended Kingsburg High School in Kingsburg in Fresno County.

Johnson's older brother Rafer preceded him as a multi-sport star at Kingsburgh High School and UCLA, ultimately winning the gold medal in the decathlon at the 1960 Summer Olympics.

UCLA
Johnson attended UCLA and played for the UCLA Bruins football team as a wingback and defensive back. He totaled 812 yards from scrimmage in 1959 and 1960. Johnson also competed in track at UCLA, won the NCAA 110-meter hurdles championship, and was named an All-American in track and field.

While a student at UCLA, Johnson joined Pi Lambda Phi Fraternity, where he is recognized as a prominent alumni brother.

NFL career
Johnson was selected by the San Francisco 49ers in the first round (sixth overall pick) of the 1961 NFL Draft and by the San Diego Chargers in the fourth round (31st overall pick) of the 1961 AFL Draft. He signed with the 49ers in June 1961. As a rookie, Johnson appeared in 12 games for the 1961 49ers, played at the cornerback position, and intercepted five passes for a career-high 116 return yards. He became a wide receiver in 1962 and caught 34 passes for 626 yards and four touchdowns. His most productive game as a wide receiver came against the Detroit Lions, in which he caught 11 passes for 181 yards. Earlier that season, he caught a game-winning 80-yard touchdown reception against the Chicago Bears, which at the time was the longest scoring pass in 49ers history. Johnson returned to defense in 1963 and played principally at safety and cornerback for the rest of his career. He remained with the 49ers for 16 years through the 1976 season, appearing in 213 NFL games.

During his 16 years in the NFL, Johnson intercepted 47 passes for 615 return yards and two touchdowns in his NFL career. He was selected four times as a first-team All-Pro: 1969 (AP, UPI), 1970 (AP, NEA, Pro Football Writers, Pro Football Weekly), 1971 (AP, NEA, Pro Football Writers, Pro Football Weekly), and 1972 (AP, NEA, Pro Football Writers, Pro Football Weekly). He was also selected to play in five Pro Bowls (1969–1972, 1974). According to his biography at the Pro Football Hall of Fame, Johnson is regarded as "one of the best man-to-man defenders in history."

Later years and honors
Johnson has received numerous honors for his football career, including the following:

 In 1977, the 49ers retired Johnson's jersey (No. 37) during halftime of a Monday night game dubbed "Jimmy Johnson Night at Candlestick Park."
 In 1978, Johnson was inducted into the Fresno Athletic Hall of Fame.
 In 1980, Johnson and Willie Brown were named the first-string cornerbacks on the NFL 1970s All-Decade Team.
 In 1990, Johnson was inducted into the Bay Area Sports Hall of Fame.
 In 1992, Johnson was inducted into the UCLA Athletics Hall of Fame.
 In 1994, he was inducted into the Pro Football Hall of Fame.
 In 2009, he was one of the charter inductees into the San Francisco 49ers Hall of Fame.

References

External links
Jimmy Johnson's personal web site
Pro Football Hall of Fame Jimmy Johnson profile

1938 births
Living people
American football cornerbacks
Santa Monica Corsairs football players
UCLA Bruins football players
San Francisco 49ers players
Pro Football Hall of Fame inductees
Rafer Johnson family
Western Conference Pro Bowl players
National Conference Pro Bowl players
National Football League players with retired numbers
Players of American football from Dallas